Down Road Nature Reserve is a protected area of Western Australia in the south-western part of the state. It has existed since 1932 and covers an area of approximately 7.78 square kilometers.

Geography
The protected area is near the village of Drome. There are a few unpaved paths through the area. A small river also flows through the area. Marbellup Flats and Seven Mile Creek wetlands extend into the sanctuary.

Flora and fauna
Beaufortia sparsa grow in the nature reserve. The forest in the sanctuary is a mixed forest of Jarrah and Marri trees.

References

Nature reserves in Western Australia
City of Albany, Western Australia
Protected areas established in 1932